This alphabetical list of filename extensions contains extensions of notable file formats used by multiple notable applications or services.

M

N

O

P

Q

R

See also
 List of file formats

References

External links
 File Extension Resource
 The File Extensions Resource
 File information site
 File format finder
 List of file types

 M
 M